Deans Gulf flows into the Mohawk River in Westernville, New York.

References

Rivers of New York (state)
Rivers of Oneida County, New York
Mohawk River